Vazhuvoor may refer to:
Vazhuvoor (dance) - One of the original styles of Bharatanatyam
Vazhuvoor (village) - A village in the Kuthalam taluk of Nagapattinam District in Tamil Nadu, India
Vazhuvoor B. Ramaiyah Pillai - A Bharathanatyam teacher from Tamil Nadu